Carl E. Olson (born April 17, 1969) is an American theologian, a Christian apologist and non-fiction author.

Early life and education
Olson was born in Hot Springs, Montana, and raised in Plains, Montana. After graduating from high school in 1987, he studied graphic design and fine art for two years at Phoenix Institute of Technology and Northwest Nazarene College. He then attended Briercrest Bible College in Saskatchewan, Canada from 1989 to 1991, graduating with an associate degree. In the fall of 1991 he moved to Portland, Oregon, where he worked as a graphic designer and illustrator. After marrying in 1994, he converted to the Catholic Church in 1997, from what he describes as a Protestant fundamentalist organisation. In 2000, he graduated from the University of Dallas with a master's degree in theological studies.

Career

His first book was Will Catholics Be "Left Behind"? A Catholic Critique of the Rapture and Today's Prophecy Preachers (Ignatius Press, 2003). Olson's second book  The Da Vinci Hoax: Exposing the Errors in The Da Vinci Code was co-authored with medievalist Sandra Miesel and was published in June 2004. He also wrote the Introduction to Pied Piper of Atheism: Philip Pullman and Children's Fantasy (Ignatius Press, 2008), which was co-authored by Miesel and Pete Vere. His third book Did Jesus Really Rise From the Dead? Questions and Answers About the Life, Death, and Resurrection of Jesus was published in 2016, as well as Called To Be the Children of God: The Catholic Theology of Human Deification, which he co-edited with Fr. David Vincent Meconi, S.J.

Olson is the editor of The Catholic World Report and Ignatius Insight, the online magazine of Ignatius Press. He is a frequent contributor to the Catholic newspaper Our Sunday Visitor, for which he writes a weekly Scripture column titled "Opening the Word." He has written hundreds of articles, book reviews, and columns for a variety of periodicals and newspapers, including First Things, National Catholic Register, and Catholic Answers Magazine. In addition to his writing, Olson has appeared on Fox, BBC radio, CNN, EWTN, and other television and radio networks.

Olson lives in Eugene, Oregon, with his wife and two children.

Books 

 Carl E. Olson and Sandra Miesel, The Da Vinci Hoax: Exposing the Errors in the Da Vinci Code, Ignatius Press, 2004;
 Carl E. Olson, Will Catholics Be Left Behind? A Critique of the Rapture and Today's Prophecy Preachers, Ignatius Press, 2009;
 Carl E. Olson and David V. Meconi , Called to Be the Children of God: The Catholic Theology of Human Deification, Ignatius Press, 2016;
 Carl E. Olson, Did Jesus Really Rise from the Dead? Questions and Answers about the Life, Death, and Resurrection of Jesus, Ignatius Press, 2016;
 Carl E. Olson, Praying the Our Father in Lent, Catholic Truth Society, 2021;
 Carl E. Olson, Prepare the Way of the Lord, Catholic Truth Society, 2021.

References

External links

 Carl E. Olson's personal website
 Catholic World Report
 Ignatius Insight, the Ignatius Press online magazine 

American male journalists
Converts to Roman Catholicism from Evangelicalism
Living people
American Roman Catholic religious writers
Northwest Nazarene University alumni
1969 births
People from Sanders County, Montana
University of Dallas alumni
Writers from Eugene, Oregon
Writers from Portland, Oregon
Journalists from Montana
20th-century American journalists
Catholics from Montana
Catholics from Oregon
Editors of Catholic publications